Genia may refer to:

 Génia, London-based Russian virtuoso concert pianist and composer
 Genia Technologies, a US nanopore based DNA sequencing company, a fully owned subsidiary of Hoffmann-La Roche
Will Genia (born 1988), Australian rugby union player
 Genia in Shadow and Bone- book